Donato and Daughter, released on video as Dead to Rights, is a 1993 American crime drama television film directed by Rod Holcomb and written by Robert Roy Pool, based on the 1988 novel of the same name by Jack Early. It stars Charles Bronson and Dana Delany as a father and daughter, both LAPD detectives, who must team up to stop a serial killer. It aired on CBS on September 21, 1993.

Plot
Two Los Angeles Police Department detectives, a father and daughter who have had a frosty relationship for a long time, must team up to stop a brutal sexual predator and serial killer who targets nuns.

Cast

External links

1993 films
1993 crime drama films
1990s English-language films
1990s police procedural films
1990s serial killer films
American crime drama films
American police detective films
American serial killer films
CBS network films
Crime television films
American drama television films
Films about Catholic nuns
Films about father–daughter relationships
Films about the Los Angeles Police Department
Films based on American crime novels
Films directed by Rod Holcomb
Films scored by Sylvester Levay
Films set in Los Angeles
Films with screenplays by Robert Roy Pool
Television films based on books
1990s American films